Leílton Silva dos Santos usually known as Leilton (born 7 March 1982) is a Brazilian former footballer.

Club career
Leílton previously played for Esporte Clube Vitória in the Campeonato Brasileiro.

Leilton started his footballing career in Brazil, but soon moved to Russia, joining FC Krylia Sovetov Samara. It was here that Leilton enjoyed the most successful period of his career, representing the team over a hundred times during a seven-year period which saw him score five goals.

References

1982 births
Sportspeople from Bahia
Living people
Brazilian footballers
Association football defenders
Esporte Clube Vitória players
PFC Krylia Sovetov Samara players
FC Shinnik Yaroslavl players
FC Volga Nizhny Novgorod players
Esporte Clube Ypiranga players
Russian Premier League players
Brazilian expatriate footballers
Expatriate footballers in Russia
Brazilian expatriate sportspeople in Russia